Frederick Harold Allen (December 6, 1890 – January 15, 1964) was an American track and field athlete who competed in the 1912 Summer Olympics. In 1912 he finished sixth in the long jump competition.

References

External links
 Profile at trackfield.brinkster.net
 Profile at Sports-Reference.com
 

1890 births
1964 deaths
American male long jumpers
Olympic track and field athletes of the United States
Athletes (track and field) at the 1912 Summer Olympics